W Amman is a  tall five–star hotel in the New Abdali district in Amman, Jordan. W Amman was opened in April 2018 and is franchised to Eagle Hills Properties, an Abu Dhabi, UAE-based real estate development firm. It features a design that was inspired by the city of Petra and has 280 rooms and 44 suites as of September 2020.

Development
A franchise deal with real estate developer Saraya Holdings was announced in late 2007. In December 2012, Saraya Holdings commissioned Dubai Contracting Company to build a  mixed use tower in Abdali. The design, put forward by architecture firm Perkins & Will was inspired by the rock formations of the Nabatean city of Petra. The $200 million project includes an eight-level podium containing high end retail units, office space,  of meeting space, restaurants, a lounge, a poolside bar, a full-service exclusive spa, a fitness center, a health club, a sauna, and a steam room.

The Skyline Residences
The top six floors of the W Amman tower contain 41 residential units, branded as The Skyline Residences. Handover of the serviced apartments to buyers began in fall 2017.

References

Hotels in Amman
W Hotels